Bollebygd Municipality (Bollebygds kommun) is a municipality in Västra Götaland County in western Sweden. Its seat is located in the town of Bollebygd.

The municipal reform of 1952 united "old" Bollebygd with Töllsjö. The next reform placed Bollebygd within Borås Municipality from 1974. In 1995 Bollebygd was re-established as a municipality in the borders of 1952.

Localities
Population as of 2011-12-31:
Bollebygd 4,170
Olsfors 652
Töllsjö 347 
Hultafors 293
"Countryside" 2,894

Politics
Result of the 2010 election:
 Moderate Party 33,14%	
 Centre party 7,22%
 Liberal People's Party 6,49%	
 Christian Democrats 6,55%	
 Swedish Social Democratic Party 26,57% 	
 Left Party 4,66%	
 Green Party 6,13%
 Sweden Democrats 8,19%
 Other Parties 1,04%

References

External links

Bollebygd Municipality - Official site

Municipalities of Västra Götaland County
South Älvsborg
1995 establishments in Sweden
States and territories disestablished in 1995